Yuri Sergeyevich Bavin (born 5 February 1994) is a Russian football player who plays as a defensive midfielder for FC SKA-Khabarovsk on loan from FC Ural Yekaterinburg.

Club career
He made his debut for the main squad of PFC CSKA Moscow in a Russian Cup game against FC Khimik Dzerzhinsk on 30 October 2013.

He made his debut in the Russian Football National League for FC Zenit-2 St. Petersburg on 12 March 2016 in a game against FC Volgar Astrakhan.

He made his Russian Premier League debut for FC Zenit St. Petersburg on 21 May 2016 in a game against FC Dynamo Moscow.

On 25 February 2021 he moved to Russian club FC Tambov, on a loan deal until the end of the season.

On 12 August 2021, he moved to FC Rotor Volgograd on loan for the 2021–22 season. On 24 August 2022, Bavin was loaned to FC SKA-Khabarovsk.

Career statistics

Club

References

External links
 
 
 Profile by Russian Football National League

1994 births
People from Kamchatka Krai
Living people
Russian footballers
Russia youth international footballers
Association football midfielders
PFC CSKA Moscow players
U.D. Leiria players
FC Zenit Saint Petersburg players
FC Zenit-2 Saint Petersburg players
FC Ural Yekaterinburg players
FC Tambov players
FC Rotor Volgograd players
FC SKA-Khabarovsk players
Campeonato de Portugal (league) players
Russian First League players
Russian Premier League players
Russian Second League players
Russian expatriate footballers
Expatriate footballers in Portugal
Russian expatriate sportspeople in Portugal